COAI can refer to:
 Cellular Operators Association of India
 Clowns of America International